Batman of Zur-En-Arrh is a character appearing in media published by DC Comics. Introduced in the Silver Age, the character is an alien named Tlano from the planet Zur-En-Arrh who decided to become a version of Batman for his own planet. The character's reappearance in the 2000s rebranded him as a violent and unhinged backup personality of Bruce Wayne.

Publication history

1950s
Batman of Zur-En-Arrh first appeared in Batman #113 (February 1958), in the story "Batman—The Superman of Planet-X!". It was written by France Herron and drawn by Dick Sprang. In the story, Tlano, the Batman from Zur-En-Arrh, brings Earth's Batman to his planet to help him battle giant robots piloted by an unidentified alien race. While on the planet, Earth's Batman discovers he has "Superman-like" powers through similar means of the Superman of his world. The end of the story leaves it ambiguous to the reader whether Batman's adventure was real or a dream.

2000s
When Grant Morrison took over the Batman series in September 2006, they began referencing classic moments from the character's career, including using a version of Bat-Mite and reusing a costume and dialogue from the then-50-year-old Batman #156. Among the references was the "Zur-En-Arrh" phrase, which appears on an alley wall and again on a dumpster in Batman #655 and continues to appear, usually as a background element graffiti, until the Batman R.I.P. story arc begins. The story reveals that the "Zur-En-Arrh" persona is a backup personality created by Bruce Wayne in the event he was ever mentally compromised. The Zur-En-Arrh personality is shown to be more violent and unhinged than Batman's normal persona and is dressed in a costume out of red, yellow, and purple rags referencing the one worn by Tlano.

2020s 
In 2022, when Chip Zdarsky took over as the new Batman writer, he reintroduced the Zur-En-Arrh persona as having created Failsafe, the titular robot who serves as a contingency plan should Bruce fall from grace.

Fictional character biography

Silver Age
One night, Bruce Wayne finds himself in a daze. He dresses as Batman and takes off in the Batplane while remaining unclear of his own actions. Batman soon finds out that he has been teleported to another planet called Zur-En-Arrh. There, he meets the scientist Tlano monitoring his activities on Earth and has decided to become a version of Batman for his own planet. On this planet, the Batman of Earth has enhanced abilities, similar to those of Superman, due to the different elements of the alien planet. The two Batmen join forces to defeat giant invading robots piloted by an unidentified alien race. After the robots are destroyed, the Batman of Zur-En-Arrh gives Batman (Bruce Wayne) his Bat-Radia device as a keepsake before he returns to Earth.

Modern Age
In the past, the psychiatrist Simon Hurt was hired to oversee an isolation experiment, for which Batman volunteered. During this process, he gave Bruce Wayne a post-hypnotic trigger connected to the phrase "Zur-En-Arrh", young Bruce Wayne's mishearing of his father's last words ("the sad thing is they'd probably throw someone like 'Zorro in Arkham'"). Many years later, Doctor Hurt was working with the Black Glove when they decided to target Batman and his allies, first spreading information to the effect that Batman's father somehow survived his murder by Joe Chill. Then, using the Zur-En-Arrh trigger in conjunction with drugs, he sent a dazed and confused Bruce Wayne onto the streets of Gotham with no memory of his life. Bruce assembles a makeshift Batman costume (of a similar style to that worn by Tlano from the Silver Age story) and declares himself "the Batman of Zur-En-Arrh".

The character Bat-Mite appears on the last page with him, commenting "uh-oh" over Batman's increasing delusions. Bat-Mite then counsels the Zur-En-Arrh Batman, revealed over the course of the story to be a backup personality created after a hallucination Batman suffered when exposed to Professor Milo's gas. It was intended to take over for Bruce Wayne if he was ever psychologically attacked in such a manner as to render Batman out of action. The colorful costume expresses a greater confidence and demonstrates a greater willingness to torture and possibly kill his opponents; on one occasion, the Zur-En-Arrh Batman describes himself as being Batman "when you take Bruce out of the equation". It is revealed that Bat-Mite is actually a product of Batman's imagination, being Batman's rational side to prevent the unstable Zur-En-Arrh persona from going too far, although he comments that he is from the 5th dimension because "the fifth dimension is imagination".

Infinite Frontier

Characterization

Costume
The costumes of the two incarnations of the Batman of Zur-En-Arrh are the same, consisting of gaudy, outlandish colors. In the modern continuity, the crazed Bruce Wayne comments that, despite the ostentatiousness of the costume, Robin had dressed this way for years, implying that it reflects the "total confidence" of the Zur-En-Arrh Batman in his ability to attract the attention of his enemies whereas the Earth Batman dresses in dark colors to attack his foes in the shadows.

Skills, abilities, and resources
Tlano possessed much high-tech equipment, owing to his residence on a futuristic planet. His version of the Batmobile had an "atomic-powered" motor, and he flew a rocket-shaped Batplane. His main weapon was the "Bat-radia", with which he could "jam atmospheric molecules", affecting the equipment of his enemies. At the end of the story, Tlano leaves Bruce with the device, which becomes inoperable in Earth's environment.

The Bruce Wayne incarnation also possesses a Bat-radia. This may or may not reflect a continuity between the two stories, as Grant Morrison has made efforts to treat Batman's entire publication history as his backstory. This version of the device scrambled security systems, for instance, overriding and confusing Arkham Asylum's, as well as serving as a tracking device to allow Batman's allies to find him. To add a note of humor to the story, the radia is presented as a "cheap-ass radio" instead of the object seen in the imaginary story, and members of the Black Glove dismiss it as such until they discover its true purpose.

In other media

Television
 The Silver Age version of the Batman of Zur-En-Arrh appears in the Batman: The Brave and the Bold episode "The Super Batman of Planet X!" voiced by Kevin Conroy. The Batman of Zur-En-Arrh is the protector of the city of Gothtropolis (an amalgam of Gotham City and Metropolis) and is aided by his robot butler Alpha-Red (voiced by James Arnold Taylor). When Batman of Earth crash lands on Zur-En-Arrh, he helps the Batman of Zur-En-Arrh stop a mugger. Chancellor Gor-Zonn (voiced by Corey Burton) asks the Batmen to battle giant robots (which are based on robots that they fought in the comics) created by mad scientist Rohtul (a variation of Lex Luthor voiced by Clancy Brown). During the fight, Batman finds that he has Superman-like powers while on Zur-En-Arrh due to the alien element rhodon. Tlano has a Clark Kent-like identity and is a reporter at the Solar Cycle Newspaper Company (Zur-En-Arrh's version of the Daily Planet), where he works with Vilsi Vaylar (an amalgam of Lois Lane and Vicki Vale voiced by Dana Delaney). In prison, Rohtul deduces that Batman is from Earth and his powers can be counteracted with quartz. Batman of Zur-En-Arrh comes to Batman's aid and the two defeat Rohtul. The Batman of Zur-En-Arrh makes a cameo appearance in the episode "Night of the Batmen!" alongside other versions of Batman that appear at the end to assist Batman.

Film
 The Modern Age version of Batman of Zur-En-Arrh appears in the Batman: Death in the Family interactive film. He appears if the viewer chooses to have Batman sacrifice himself to save Jason Todd and to have Jason initially keep his dying wish to avoid killing the Joker. Jason becomes the vigilante, Red Hood and attempts to take down the Joker without killing criminals, but eventually realizes he's been slaughtering them while repressing his memories of their deaths. After the viewer chooses again whether Jason should kill the Joker or not, Red Hood becomes a wanted fugitive. Talia al Ghul confronts Jason on top of a Wayne Enterprises building and offers him the chance to join the League of Assassins with a resurrected Bruce, who was brought back to life with the Lazarus Pit. However, the pit also drove him insane, leading him to don the colorful costume and causing him to only be able to say "Zur-En-Arrh". Red Hood refuses to join and fights Batman, and outcome of the fight is determined by whether the viewer chose to kill or save Bruce.
 If Jason decides to kill Bruce, he manages to fatally wound him, but is unable to stop him from detonating an explosion that kills him, Jason and Talia.
 If Jason decides to save Bruce, he uses a taser to knock him unconscious. Talia then attempts to kill Jason herself, but was also defeated when Jason detonates his own mask. Grayson arrives to find both Jason and Bruce alive and brings them to the Batcave, where they attempt to help Bruce regain his sanity. The ending of this scene reveals that the phrase "Zur-En-Arrh", references how Bruce's father, right after walking out of the movie theater the night he and his wife were murdered, mentioned to his son how Gotham would rather lock up "Zorro in Arkham" instead of welcoming him.

Video games
 Batman of Zur-En-Arrh appears as a playable character in Lego Batman 3: Beyond Gotham (2014), voiced by Troy Baker.
 Batman of Zur-En-Arrh appears as an unlockable alternate costume for Batman in Batman: Arkham Knight (2015). It was originally unlockable by linking a WB Play Account to the game. In 2020, this, along with the Anime Batman skin, was made freely available in a new update that removed WB Play connectivity from the game.
 Batman of Zur-En-Arrh appears as an unlockable alternate costume for Batman in Doodle Jump: DC Super Heroes (2015). It can be unlocked by getting to level 26.
 Batman has two unlockable shaders based on Batman of Zur-En-Arrh in Injustice 2 (2017). The shaders are named "Zur-En-Arrh" and "Zur-En-Arrh (Alternative)".
 Zur-En-Arrh suits for Dick Grayson, Barbara Gordon, Jason Todd & Tim Drake appear in Gotham Knights.

References

Comics characters introduced in 1958
DC Comics martial artists
Alternative versions of Batman
DC Comics aliens
DC Comics extraterrestrial superheroes
DC Comics male superheroes
DC Comics scientists
Characters created by France Herron
Characters created by Dick Sprang